Choke-To-Death Butte is a summit in Park County, Montana, in the United States.

References

Mountains of Park County, Montana
Mountains of Montana